The Elk River is a  long river, in the southeastern Kootenay district of the Canadian province of British Columbia. It is a tributary of the Kootenay River, and falls within the basin of the Columbia River.

Course
The Elk River originates from the Elk Lakes near the Continental Divide in the Rocky Mountains. It flows through the Elk Valley in a southwesterly direction, joining the Kootenay River in Lake Koocanusa, just north of the British Columbia-Montana border. Its waters ultimately join the Columbia River and flow towards the Pacific Ocean.

The Elk River runs through the communities of Elkford, Sparwood, Hosmer, Fernie, and Elko.

History
David Thompson travelled along the Elk River in 1811, and called it the Stag River. James Sinclair's second settlement expedition to the Pacific Northwest from the Red River Colony made a difficult crossing from the Kananaskis River valley into the Columbia–Kootenays via the Elk in 1854. The river was labelled Elk River on John Palliser's 1857–58 map and "Stag or Elk River" on Arrowsmith's 1862 map.

Elko Dam

Elko Dam was built by East Kootenay Power Company on the Elk River in 1924. The powerhouse has two Francis turbines producing 12MW of electricity. It is about  upriver from the Elk's confluence with Lake Koocanusa. It is operated by BC Hydro.

Fishing
The fishing in the Elk River is known to be some of the best fly-fishing in North America, with large, wild cutthroat and bull trout aplenty.

Coal mining impacts
The Elk River Valley is home to five large open-pit coal mines, supplying a third of the world's steel-making coal. For many years increased selenium, phosphate and nitrate levels have been linked to the continued expansion of the mining.  Selenium levels continue to exceed the guidelines for human health.  The selenium pollution has heavily impacted the cutthroat trout in the river, which suffer from deformation of their gills.

Since Teck Resources operates the coal mines that are the source of the selenium pollution, the company is working to implement selenium management strategies.

Tributaries
Fording River
Michel Creek
Coal Creek
Lizard Creek
Wigwam River

References

External links
 Elk River Alliance
 Elk River Guiding Company

Rivers of British Columbia
Elk Valley (British Columbia)
East Kootenay
Tributaries of the Kootenay River
Rivers of the Canadian Rockies
Kootenay Land District